Rebus is an album by American jazz guitarist Joe Morris with reedist Ken Vandermark, who played tenor sax, and drummer Luther Gray. It was recorded in 2006 and released on the Portuguese Clean Feed label. Morris and Vandermark have recorded before on Like Rays, a trio date with pianist Hans Poppel. Morris also joined Vandermark's DKV Trio on Deep Telling.

Reception

In his review for All About Jazz Andrey Henkin states "The music contained on Rebus, a word defined as a representation, is fascinating for its perpendicular nature. With Luther Gray's solid and expansive drumming, Morris and Vandermark play against each other, the former working vertically while the latter moves horizontally."

Track listing
All compositions by Morris / Vandermark / Gray
 "Rebus 1"  – 10:37
 "Rebus 2" – 10:03
 "Rebus 3" – 5:37 
 "Rebus 4" – 5:45
 "Rebus 5"  – 12:49
 "Rebus 6" – 12:59

Personnel
Joe Morris - guitar
Ken Vandermark – tenor sax
Luther Gray – drums

References

2007 albums
Joe Morris (guitarist) albums
Ken Vandermark albums
Clean Feed Records albums